Numerous polls of support for political parties in Ireland were taken between the 2011 general election and the 2016 general election, held on Friday, 26 February 2016. The article also contains polls taken after the election while a government was being formed.

Two main tables of opinion polls are shown below.  The top table lists opinion polls taken in 2016, the election year, and includes all political parties with Dáil representation, plus the Green Party.  The second table, for polls from the last general election in 2011 up to 2015, does not break out Renua Ireland or the Social Democrats, which were both founded in 2015.

2016
Color key:

2011–2015

Graphical summary

Poll results

Polling Companies
Four companies carry out national and sectoral opinion polls in Ireland. They use different methodologies, which can have a bearing on overall accuracy.

Normally the sample size for a national poll is in the very low thousands with a margin of error of ~ 3%

The methodologies used by the four companies are:

Footnotes

References

2016 Irish general election
Ireland
Opinion polling in the Republic of Ireland